Benny Bernhard Heinz Wendt (born 4 November 1950) is a Swedish former professional footballer who played as a forward.

Playing career 
Wendt started his career with IFK Norrköping in 1975. He later moved to 1. FC Köln, Tennis Borussia Berlin, 1. FC Kaiserslautern, Seiko, Standard Liège and SC Freiburg. He helped Standard Liège to reach the UEFA Cup Winners' Cup Final in 1982, where they were beaten 2–1 by FC Barcelona. He also played in the 1978 FIFA World Cup for Sweden national football team.

Honours 
IFK Norrköping
 Swedish Cup: runner-up 1971–72

Standard Liège
 Belgian First Division: 1981–82, 1982–83
 Belgian Super Cup: 1981, 1983
 European Cup Winners' Cup: runner-up 1981–82
 Intertoto Cup Group Winners: 1982

1. FC Kaiserslautern
 DFB-Pokal: runner-up 1980–81

References

External links 
 
 

1950 births
Living people
Sportspeople from Norrköping
Swedish footballers
Swedish expatriate footballers
Sweden international footballers
1978 FIFA World Cup players
Association football forwards
IFK Norrköping players
1. FC Köln players
Tennis Borussia Berlin players
1. FC Kaiserslautern players
Standard Liège players
Seiko SA players
SC Freiburg players
Bundesliga players
2. Bundesliga players
Belgian Pro League players
Hong Kong First Division League players
Swedish expatriate sportspeople in West Germany
Expatriate footballers in West Germany
Swedish expatriate sportspeople in Belgium
Expatriate footballers in Belgium
Swedish expatriate sportspeople in Hong Kong
Expatriate footballers in Hong Kong
Footballers from Östergötland County